Stephen A. Zappala Jr. is a Democratic politician and attorney who is the District Attorney of Allegheny County, Pennsylvania.

Family
Zappala is the son of Phyllis Zappala (née Koleno) and Stephen Zappala Sr., a former Justice of the Pennsylvania Supreme Court, and grandson of Frank J. Zappala, a now-deceased Pennsylvania attorney, magistrate and legislator.

Education
After graduating from Central Catholic High School in Pittsburgh, Zappala Jr. began his undergraduate studies at the University of Delaware, where he played linebacker.  After a back injury sidelined him, he transferred to the University of Pittsburgh, where he graduated with a degree in political science.  He earned his J.D. from Duquesne University School of Law.

Career
Upon graduation from law school, he joined the Pittsburgh law firms of Grogan, Graffam, McGinley & Lucchino and Dattilo, Barry, Fasulo & Cambest as an associate.  In 1990, he became a partner at Brucker, Zappala, Schneider & Porter, another Pittsburgh law firm.  In 1995, he was named Chairman of the Allegheny County Board of Viewers.

In December 1997, then-District Attorney Robert E. Colville announced he was leaving the position to become judge on the Court of Common Pleas.  Zappala was appointed by the Allegheny County's Common Pleas judges with 22 votes.  His primary rival for the position, W. Christopher Conrad, received 6 votes. Shortly after his 1998 swearing-in as District Attorney, Zappala fired Conrad, who had been working in the District Attorney's office as lead homicide prosecutor.

Zappala defeated Conrad again in the 1999 Democratic primary election for the district attorney position, with 63% of the vote. However, Conrad successfully pursued write-in votes on the Republican ballot, which led to Zappala facing Conrad again in the general election in November 1999.  Zappala won handily.

In 2004, he became embroiled in a war of words with County Coroner Dr. Cyril Wecht, stemming from an open inquest Wecht pursued. Wecht accused Zappala of "impudence, arrogance, gall of an unmitigated nature, hubris and unsurpassed chutzpah that absolutely defies explanation," and musing, "Who does the district attorney think he is?"

When Wecht was later indicted on a variety of charges, a defense attorney blamed Zappala for the probe, saying it was politically motivated.

In 2012, when Maddox Derkosh was killed by African wild dogs after falling into their exhibit at the Pittsburgh Zoo, he stated that he will not charge his mother, Elizabeth Derkosh, who lifted him to get a better point of view and is still investigating if the zoo is at fault.

Zappala is currently in a dispute with Pittsburgh Public Safety Director Stephen A. Bucar over whether the city police bureau should change its eyewitness identification procedures. Zappala is urging the police bureau to discontinue its use of simultaneous photo arrays, in which witnesses are typically shown photos of six to eight suspects on one sheet of paper, in favor of sequential photo arrays, in which they are shown photos individually.

In 2016, DA Zappala paid nearly $1,400 in bitcoin as ransom after his office computer network was taken hostage by the Avalanche phishing group.

In 2019, Zappala was re-elected with 57 percent of the vote. https://results.enr.clarityelections.com/PA/Allegheny/98378/web.258506/#/detail/0114

In 2021, Zappala sent an email to his prosecutors instructing them not to offer plea deals a well-known black attorney who had criticized the criminal justice system. Shortly thereafter, an Allegheny County Common Pleas judge said he would no longer accept plea deals from Zappala's office, saying it was wrong to treat defendants differently based on who represents them.

Personal life
Zappala lives in suburban Fox Chapel, Pennsylvania with his wife, Mary.  They have four sons.

See also

 District Attorney
 Pittsburgh Police
 Allegheny County Sheriff
 Allegheny County Police Department

References

External links
Office of the Allegheny County District Attorney official website

1957 births
County district attorneys in Pennsylvania
Duquesne University alumni
Lawyers from Pittsburgh
Living people
Pennsylvania Democrats
University of Delaware alumni
University of Pittsburgh alumni
Central Catholic High School (Pittsburgh) alumni